George Irving is an English actor known for playing Anton Meyer in Holby City from 1999 to 2002. He previously had a regular role as DI Ken Jackson in the first two series of Dangerfield (1995). He has also been in The Sweeney, The Professionals, Shoestring, Juliet Bravo, Bergerac, Dempsey and Makepeace, EastEnders as Trevor Smith,  Inspector Morse, Peak Practice, The Bill, Cadfael, Casualty, Dalziel and Pascoe and Doctors.

In 2006 he starred in Daniel Mulloy’s BAFTA Award winning short film Antonio's Breakfast.  Also in 2006 he toured in John Fowles' The French Lieutenant's Woman.

In May/June 2007 he starred in Conor McPherson's Shining City at the Octagon Theatre, Bolton. His portrayal of John in Shining City earned him a nomination for Best Actor in the Manchester Evening News Theatre Awards.

He starred in Howard Barker's The Dying of Today at the Arcola Theatre in London in November 2008 with Duncan Bell.

In the autumn of 2009 he returned to the Octagon Theatre, Bolton and starred in David Thacker's first two productions, in his new role as Artistic Director of the theatre, Arthur Miller's All My Sons and Henrik Ibsen's Ghosts.

In 2010 he played the part of Sean Jackson in an improvised play based on documentary interviews with real orchestral players, conductors and managers, devised, directed and produced by Rosie Boulton. The Orchestra was broadcast on 23 July 2010 as part of The Afternoon Play series on BBC Radio 4.

In 2010, he played the part of Mr Georgeson, a headmaster, in the Moving On episode "Losing My Religion".

Notes

External links
GeorgeIrving.co.uk.

English male soap opera actors
1954 births
Living people
Actors from County Durham